The Chronic Poverty Research Centre (CPRC) is an international partnership of universities, research institutes, and NGOs established in 2000 with initial funding from the UK's Department for International Development. Addressing chronic poverty is integral to the Millennium Development Goals and poverty eradication.

CPRC aims to focus attention on chronic poverty, stimulate national and international debate, deepen understanding of the causes of chronic poverty, and provide research, analysis, and policy guidance that will contribute to its reduction. The distinguishing feature of chronic poverty is its extended duration. CPRC uses chronic poverty to describe extreme poverty that persists for a long time—many years, an entire life, or even across generations. People in chronic poverty are those who have benefited least from economic growth and development. The chronically poor are commonly deprived across multiple dimensions. Combinations of capability deprivation, low levels of material assets and socio-political marginality keep them poor over long periods. 

Gordon Brown and Hilary Benn launched the first Chronic Poverty Report in May 2004.

References

External links

 

Research on poverty